Bikini Jones and the Temple of Eros is a 2010 American made for cable comedy erotic film written and directed by Fred Olen Ray (under the pseudonym name Nicholas Juan Medina). It is a porn spoof of Indiana Jones.

Plot
Dr. Bikini Jones (Christine Nguyen), an archaeologist, steals the Golden Idol which happens to be the key to a mysterious place called the Temple of Eros. Legend has it that anyone who discovers the Tiara of Ayesha in that temple becomes the supreme ruler of the country Moronica. Jones must prevail against her adversary, Evilla Cruella (Heather Vandeven), to get to the tiara.

A nation called Moronica also appeared in The Three Stooges short You Nazty Spy! and its sequel I'll Never Heil Again. Whether the name's use in this film is a case of homage or of coincidence is unclear.

Cast
 Christine Nguyen as Dr. Bikini Jones
 Heather Vandeven as Evilla Cruella
 Ted Newsom as Mr. Martin
 Rebecca Love as Carol
 Frankie Cullen as Drago
 Billy Chappell as Mark X
 Brynn Tyler as Security Guard
 Jayden Cole as Party Girl

Release
The film was produced by the production company Retromedia Entertainment. It was broadcast several times in fall 2010 at fixed times and on demand on the premium channel Cinemax. It was released on DVD on March 2, 2010.  It was the subject of controversy when Apple allowed a Cinemax app on iTunes.

Reception
DVD Verdict made special note that the film used communicable disease as a plot device.  The film was awarded 8 out of 10 points by Tarstarkas.net.

References

External links
 
 
 

2010 television films
2010 films
Films directed by Fred Olen Ray
American sex comedy films
2010s sex comedy films
2010s parody films
Parody films based on Indiana Jones films
2010s English-language films
Pornographic parody films
2010s American films